Schistura globiceps is a species of ray-finned fish in the genus Schistura. It has only been collected from a single stream in the upper Nam Tha watershed in Laos where it was found under stones in a fast flowing hill stream.

References 

G
Fish described in 2000